John Kerins (19 July 1962 – 21 August 2001) was an Irish Gaelic football manager and player. In a career that spanned two decades he played at club level with St Finbarr's and at senior inter-county level with the Cork county team.

Career
Kerins first came to prominence as a schoolboy with Coláiste Chríost Rí with whom he won successive Corn Uí Mhuirí titles. He subsequently made his senior debut at club level with St Finbarr's and won one All-Ireland Club Championship title during a 15-year career. Kerins first appeared on the inter-county scene as a dual player at minor level before winning an All-Ireland Under-21 Championship title as reserve goalkeeper to Michael Creedon in 1981. He subsequently joined the Cork senior football team, once again as understudy to Creedon, and won the first of seven Munster Championship titles in his debut season in 1983. Kerins later added a National League to his collection before claiming successive All-Ireland medals in 1989 and 1990. A two-time All-Star-winner, he was also selected for Munster. In retirement from playing Kerins served as coach of the St Finbarr's minor and senior teams, guiding the former to championship success.

Personal life and death
Born in Cork, Kerins joined the Garda Síochána and was based in Gurranabraher where he reached the rank of detective. On 21 August 2001, three months after being diagnosed with cancer, Kerins died at the age of 39.

Honours
Coláiste Chríost Rí
Corn Uí Mhuirí: 1979, 1980

St Finbarr's
All-Ireland Senior Club Football Championship: 1987
Munster Senior Club Football Championship: 1982, 1986
Cork Senior Football Championship: 1982, 1985

Cork
All-Ireland Senior Football Championship: 1989, 1990
Munster Senior Football Championship: 1983, 1987, 1988, 1989, 1990, 1993, 1994
National Football League: 1988-89
All-Ireland Under-21 Football Championship: 1981
Munster Under-21 Football Championship: 1981, 1982

References

1962 births
2001 deaths
Cork inter-county Gaelic footballers
Dual players
Gaelic football coaches
Gaelic football goalkeepers
Garda Síochána officers
Munster inter-provincial Gaelic footballers
People educated at Coláiste Chríost Rí
St Finbarr's Gaelic footballers
St Finbarr's hurlers
Sportspeople from Cork (city)
Winners of two All-Ireland medals (Gaelic football)